Thomas Andrew Walker (15 October 1828 – 25 November 1889) was an English civil engineering contractor.

He worked on major infrastructure projects in the latter half of the 19th century, including the Severn Tunnel and the London District Railway.

Early life and education
Walker was born at Brewood in Staffordshire. He was educated at King's College London.

Notable projects
After his work on the Grand Trunk Railway of Canada in 1852 and extensive surveys in Russia, Egypt and Sudan, in the years 1863–1865, he was offered, and accepted, the management of the construction of the District Railway in London.  He was then entrusted with the still more difficult work of completing the Severn Tunnel at the request of Sir John Hawkshaw. Walker was engaged for seven years in the construction of this tunnel. When he began work on the project he had already accumulated considerable experience in railway survey and construction throughout Canada, Russia, Egypt and England.

In writing his memoirs of his work on the Severn Tunnel he states: 'Sub-aqueous tunnels have recently become quite the fashion. One such experience as the Severn Tunnel, with its ever-varying and strangely contorted strata, and the dangers from floods above and floods below, has been sufficient for me. One sub-aqueous tunnel is quite enough for a lifetime.' The tunnel was completed in 1887, having a length of 4 miles 628 yards.
 
Other works that he undertook were the Barry Dock and Railway, and the Preston Dock, and in addition, he carried out the contract for the Buenos Aires Harbour Works with John Hawkshaw, resident engineer James Murray Dobson and Joseph Talbot engineer.

His final undertaking was the construction of the Manchester Ship Canal which has been described as the greatest engineering achievement of Victorian times. It is certainly an immense achievement and transformed an inland city into a major port. Walker was engaged as the sole contractor in charge of the construction and he divided the thirty-six-mile route into nine (soon reduced to eight) sections and appointed an engineer to take charge of each. However, he died before the completion of this project.

Personal life
Walker died of Bright's disease, at his home in Caerwent, Monmouthshire, on 25 November 1889 and was buried at St Stephen's Church. 

Walker was known to be an excellent employer, looking after the needs of his workforce as best as he could and provided accommodation, meeting halls and hospital facilities.

Upon his death, he left nearly £1 million. 

His nephew Charles Hay Walker, of Falkland Park, South Norwood was also a civil engineer with major works and docks constructed in Uruguay.

After his death, Walker's contracts were continued by his Executors and subsequently by the formation of C. H. Walker & Co Ltd. by Thomas's nephew Charles.

References

External links

Monmouthshire Library weblink
 Article from Great Western Archive which closely follows Walker's monograph

1828 births
1889 deaths
English civil engineers
Alumni of King's College London
People from South Staffordshire District
People associated with transport in London